Robert Edmund "Bob" Bill was an American football player and businessman.  He was born in Mineola, NY and played football at the University of Notre Dame during the single-platoon era.  He was drafted by the New York Giants in 1962 as a tackle, signing a two-year deal.  He subsequently worked in the commercial insurance industry, and died on June 3, 2012.

References

People from Mineola, New York
Notre Dame Fighting Irish football players
2012 deaths